Kumbhir-class landing ships are medium amphibious warfare vessels of the Indian Navy.

Ships of the class

Gallery

See also
List of active Indian Navy ships
List of ships of the Indian Navy

References

 
Amphibious warfare vessel classes
Naval ships built in Poland for export
India–Poland relations